The Heritage of Belarus project began to be implemented in 2004, when the authors Aliaksandr Aliakseyeu and Aleh Lukashevich presented it at the headquarters of UNESCO in Paris (France). Opening the exhibition by the Director-General of UNESCO,Koïchiro Matsuura. The project includes: the creation of art book-albums, documentaries and photo exhibitions  about the historical and cultural heritage of Belarus.

Belarus Today:

On October 25, 2004 in Vatican, the authors gave the Pope John Paul II the album “Heritage of Belarus” as a present.
In 2012 finished the work under the creation of the series of documentary films of the art project “Heritage of Belarus” about outstanding natives of Belarus, who have made significant contributions to the development of the world community. They created the 11 documentary films including Epoch of Marc Chagall, Euphrosyne of Polotsk, Louis Mayer, Lion of Hollywood, Stanisław August Poniatowski, Tadeusz Kosciuszko, Return of the Hero, Epoch of Adam Mickiewicz, Ignacy Domeyko, Nikolai Sudzilovsky, Epoch, The Famous Unknown Ivan Khrutsky, Epoch of  Maksim Bahdanovič, and Epoch of Napoleon Orda.

On 5 October 2018 the  photoexhibition by Aliaksandr Aliakseyeu and Aleh Lukashevich "Heritage of Belarus" opened in the 
Independence Palace, Minsk. Now there is a permanent exhibition of these authors in the Ceremonial Hall of the Palace of Independence.

Recognition and awards
In 2010, 2020 The art project of Aliaksandr Aliakseyeu and Aleh Lukashevich “Heritage of Belarus” was nominated for the State Prize of the Republic of Belarus.

Books-albums 
Belarusian Telegraph Agency:

 2004 - "Heritage of Belarus" 1st edition (circulation 3000 copies) ISBN 985-454-231-9
 2005 - "Heritage of Belarus" 2nd and 3rd edition (total circulation 6000 copies) ISBN 985-454-288-2
 2006 - "Heritage of Belarus" 1st edition (circulation 3000 copies) ISBN 985-454-301-3
 2006 - "Heritage of Belarus" 4th edition (circulation 3000 copies) ISBN 985-454-302-1
 2007 - "Heritage of Belarus.Treasures" (circulation 3000 copies) ISBN 978-985-454-388-8
 2007 - "Heritage of Belarus" 5th and 6th edition. Circulation 8000 copies. ISBN 978-985-454-354-3
 2007 - "Heritage of Belarus" 2nd edition (circulation 3500 copies) ISBN 978-985-454-338-2
 2009 - "Heritage of Belarus" 1st edition (circulation 3000 copies) ISBN 978-985-90180-2-2
 2009 - "Heritage of Belarus" 3rd edition (circulation 3000 copies) ISBN 978-985-454-483-0
 2010 - "Heritage of Belarus" 4th edition (circulation 5000 copies) ISBN 978-985-454-566-0
 2013 - "Heritage of Belarus" 2nd edition (circulation 1000 copies) ISBN 978-985-7058-20-4
 2013 - "Treasures of Belarus" 1st edition (circulation 1000 copies) ISBN 978-985-7058-46-4
 2014 - "Treasures of Belarus" 2nd edition (circulation 1000 copies), (3rd edition 1000 copies) ISBN 978-985-7103-09-6
 2015 - "Heritage of Belarus" 1st edition (circulation 1000 copies) ISBN 978-985-90353-3-3
 2017 - "Heritage of Belarus" 2nd edition (circulation 1000 copies) ISBN 978-985-90353-7-1
 2021 - "Heritage of Belarus" 1st edition (exclusive edition of 500 copies) ISBN 978-985-90433-3-8
The total circulation for 2021 is 47 thousand copies.

References

External links
 Famous TV host Oleg Lukashevich
 TV series about Belarusian artists broadcast on Lithuanian TV
 Alexander Alexeev and Oleg Lukashevich present new photographic album Heritage of Belarus
 W Narodowym Muzeum Historii Republiki Białoruś Aleksander Aleksiejew i Oleg Łukaszewicz przedstawili nową książkę-album
 Art exhibition by Oleg Lukashevich and Alexander Alekseev in Vienne
 On Cooperation Between Belarus and UNESCO
 In 2005, M. Oleg Lukashevich and M. Aliaksandr Alakseyeu collected some archives on Marc Chagall 
 Actress Fanny Ardant and journalists Alexandr Alexeev and Oleg Lukashevich
 Aleksander Aleksiejew i Oleg Łukaszewicz znajdują wspaniałe skarby i odkrywają niezbadane brzegi swojego kraju
 Oleg Loukachevitch and his collaborators prepare a 26-minute documentary on Zarfin 
 "Heritage of Belarus: Treasures" continues the Heritage of Belarus publication series initiated in 2004
 Artists of the School of Paris Born in Belarus
 Spadchyna Belarusi : Skarby = Heritage of Belarus : Treasures
 The Artists of the School of Paris Born in Belarus 
 The exhibition features reproductions from the photo albums by Alexander Alekseyev and Oleg Lukashevich

Cultural heritage of Belarus